Cedar Point Shores (formerly Soak City) is a water park located adjacent to Cedar Point in Sandusky, Ohio. It is owned and operated by Cedar Fair.

History
The waterpark opened as Soak City in 1988 adjacent to Cedar Point. The original complex consisted of 10 slides. In 1990, Main Stream and Tadpole Town were added. In 1995, Zoom Flume, Renegade River, and Choo-Choo Lagoon were added. A 6.5-acre addition in 1997 included a 22,500-sq. ft. wave pool, an action slide area with three twisting enclosed inner tube raft slides, an activity pool section with various interactive water elements, and an adult activity area with whirlpools and a swim-up refreshment center. SplasH2O, an interactive water structure was added in 2004. All the water slides in the main complex were repainted for the 2012 season, also a new Mat Racer, Dragster H2O (Now known as "Riptide Raceway"), was added for the 2012 season. Dragster H2O replaced the speed slides that were original to the park. On August 18, 2016, Cedar Point announced that Soak City would be renamed Cedar Point Shores, and would be expanded to include a slide complex, and a new family Splashground called Lemmy's Lagoon, replacing the old Choo Choo Lagoon that was demolished. The Surf Shop was also demolished. A new building was built for the merchandise. All current slides were renamed according to the Cedar Point Shores website.

Slides and attractions
Cedar Point Shores offers a wide variety of water slides and other attractions including:

Former attractions

Gallery

See also
 Other Soak City locations
 List of Cedar Fair water parks

References

External links
 
 Soak City Photo Gallery

 Buildings and structures in Sandusky, Ohio
 Water parks in Ohio
 Tourist attractions in Erie County, Ohio
 Cedar Fair water parks
1988 establishments in Ohio